Spoilers of the Plains  is a 1951 American Western film directed by William Witney, and starring Roy Rogers and Penny Edwards, with Foy Willing and the Riders of the Purple Sage. The film was distributed by Republic Pictures.

"Happy Trails" song
In 1951, Willing had written a song titled "Happy Trails" for the movie.  Subsequently, the first three notes of his song and its title were used by Dale Evans in writing her version of "Happy Trails" for both the original The Roy Rogers Show and the short-lived The Roy Rogers and Dale Evans Show, which aired on ABC in 1962.  Dale's is the version that is popularly played and sung today, albeit without giving credit to Willing.

Cast
Credited cast members include: 
 Roy Rogers as Roy Rogers
 Trigger as Trigger
 Penny Edwards as Frankie Manning 
 Gordon Jones as Splinters Fedders 
 Grant Withers as Gregory Camwell 
 Don Haggerty as Henchman Ben Rix 
 Fred Kohler, Jr. as Henchman Brooks
 House Peters, Jr. as Henchman Scheller 
 George Meeker as Scientist Jim 
 Keith Richards as Guard Travis
 Foy Willing as Singer and Oil Co. Worker Scheller
 Riders of the Purple Sage as Singers and Oil Co. Workers

References

External links
 

1951 films
1951 Western (genre) films
American Western (genre) films
Films directed by William Witney
Republic Pictures films
American black-and-white films
1950s English-language films
1950s American films